Bakori  is a local government area in Katsina State, Nigeria. It was created on 15 May 1989 by the then military governor of Katsina State Major General Lawrence Onoja

It has an area of 679 km2 and a population of 641,576 as of the 2006 census. Moreover, it shares border with Funtua by the west, Malumfashi in the north, Danja in the south and Kankara in the east. Federal Government Girls College is located at Bakori.

The postal code of the area is 831.

Notable people from Bakori 

Notable people from Bakori include:
 
 
Amina Lawal - sentenced to death by stoning for adultery, but eventually acquitted
Senator Mohammed Tukur Liman - former Senate Majority Leader (1999-2003)

Geography 
Bakori local government area covers a total land area of 679 square kilometres with wind speed of 4 km/h. The area has an average temperature of 36 °C, while the humidity of the area is recorded at 14%.

References

External links
The official website of Bakori Local Government in Katsina State

Local Government Areas in Katsina State